"Beyond Those Years" is a song written by Troy Seals and Eddie Setser, and recorded by American country music group The Oak Ridge Boys.  It was released in April 1989 as the third single from the album Monongahela.  The song reached #7 on the Billboard Hot Country Singles & Tracks chart.

In 2011, the group re-recorded the song with a new arrangement and tenor singer Joe Bonsall on lead vocals for their It's Only Natural project at Cracker Barrel Old Country Store. The album included songs originally sung by Steve Sanders. The lineup on the new album included Golden on baritone vocals.

Chart performance

Year-end charts

References

1989 singles
The Oak Ridge Boys songs
Songs written by Troy Seals
Song recordings produced by Jimmy Bowen
MCA Records singles
Songs written by Eddie Setser
1988 songs